Pselaphokentron bradypygum is a beetle in the genus Pselaphokentron of the family Mordellidae. It was described in 1955 by Franciscolo.

References

Mordellidae
Beetles described in 1955